Old Forge is a hamlet (and census-designated place) on New York State Route 28 in the town of Webb in Herkimer County, New York, United States. The population was 756 at the 2010 census. Old Forge was formerly a village but dissolved its incorporation in 1936, but it remains the principal community in the region. As one of the western gateway communities of the Adirondack Park, Old Forge forms an extensive business district, primarily directed at tourism especially during the summer months. The local school is the Town of Webb UFSD, a K–12 institution with the Eskimo as their mascot. Old Forge often records the lowest winter temperatures in New York.

History

In 1798, the  area including Old Forge came into possession of the Brown family of Rhode Island, through a transaction involving Aaron Burr. John Francis Brown built a  wagon trail from Remsen and attempted to settle about 20 families in the area. The land was unsuitable for farming, these attempts failed, and the area was abandoned by 1803.

One of John Brown's daughters, Sarah "Sally" Brown (1773–1846), married in 1801 Charles Frederick Herreshoff II (1763–1819). Together, they moved to the area and attempted to raise sheep, opened an iron mine, and built the first forge. These ventures again failed, and Herreshoff committed suicide in 1819. (see Herreshoff family) A few settlers remained, including Nat Foster.

The railroad was built in 1888, originally horse-drawn with wooden rails. Before the railroad was completed, the plans were changed to use steam power rather than horses. A station was constructed at nearby Thendara.

Old Forge was incorporated as a village in October 1903. The incorporation would be short-lived, as residents voted to dissolve the village on July 11, 1933, 117 to 96, due to the high cost of government operations. A second vote for the final dissolution plan took place on October 21, 1933, also in favor. The New York Supreme Court, 5th Judicial District, handed down a court order three months later suspending the dissolution process due to a lawsuit claiming the special election in October was illegal based on taxpayer and distribution factors within the plan. After an appeal to the New York Supreme Court, Appellate Division, Fourth Department, the Village of Old Forge was officially able to dissolve on March 31, 1936.

Attractions
Enchanted Forest Water Safari in Old Forge is New York's largest water theme park as of 2018.

Old Forge Lake Cruises is one of the top-rated boat tours in the entirety of the Adirondacks. It provides 2-hour tours the Fulton Chain of Lakes. They operated the longest-running mail boat delivery service east of the Mississippi river until 2016.

The western terminus of the Northern Forest Canoe Trail is found near Old Forge. The water trail continues on for approximately 700 miles to the eastern terminal in Fort Kent, Maine. The route was completed in 2006 and runs through both public and private lands. It is based on routes once used by Native Americans and pioneers and is the longest water trail in the United States.

The Goodsell House was listed on the National Register of Historic Places in 2006.

Many peaks can be seen from the village, including McCauley Mountain, home of McCauley Mountain Ski Resort.

Snowfall totals also contribute to the area's other primary winter draw, snowmobiling. These trails, combined with operative sidewalk and limited street use, often ridable frozen lakes (especially the adjoining Fulton Chain of Lakes), and connection to other large trail systems, offer substantial area for the sport.

View Arts Center is a community center that offers a broad range of activities, including exhibitions, performances, events and workshops, in addition to on-going offerings of yoga, private painting and pottery lessons and group classes.

Airport and dam 
Old Forge Airport is a small grass-field airport that is one mile north of the actual town. There are two runways. The airport is unattended and is privately owned. Permission must be obtained before landing. The Old Forge Dam separates the Fulton Chain of Lakes and the Moose River.

Geography and climate
The community lies within the Adirondack Mountains, a southern extension of the Canadian Shield and an important geologic feature of New York. As with any settlement in Adirondack Park, development both inside and outside the hamlet of Old Forge is somewhat restricted, and land use policies set forth by the Adirondack Park Agency must be observed.

The primary highway passing through Old Forge is New York State Route 28, leading east  to Raquette Lake and southwest  to Route 12 at Alder Creek. Old Forge lies along the Moose River at the western end of the Fulton Chain of Lakes. The climate is cool summer humid continental.

Demographics

As of the census of 2010, there were 756 people, 371 households, and 208 families residing in the CDP. The population density was 420.0 people per square mile (260.7/km2). The racial makeup of the CDP was 97.0% White, 0.4% Black or African American, 0.7% Native American, 0.3% Asian, 0.0% Pacific Islander, 0.1% from other races, and 1.6% from two or more races. Hispanic or Latino of any race were 1.2% of the population.

There were 371 households, out of which 19.4% had children under the age of 18 living with them, 46.1% were married couples living together, 5.9% had a female householder with no husband present, and 43.9% were non-families. 38.0% of all households were made up of individuals, and 15.4% had someone living alone who was 65 years of age or older. The average household size was 2.04 and the average family size was 2.67.

In the CDP, the population was spread out, with 19.0% under the age of 20, 5.2% from 20 to 24, 19.5% from 25 to 44, 37.4% from 45 to 64, and 19.1% who were 65 years of age or older. The median age was 47.9 years. For every 100 females, there were 95.3 males. For every 100 females age 18 and over, there were 97.2 males.

The median income for a household in the CDP was $32,539, and the median income for a family was $62,708. Males had a median income of $32,750 versus $31,761 for females. The per capita income for the CDP was $26,662. About 3.3% of families and 10.9% of the population were below the poverty line, including 0.0% of those under age 18 and 10.6% of those age 65 or over.

Housing
There were 778 housing units at an average density of 432.2 per square mile (165.5/km2). 407 units, or 52.3%, were vacant, of which 351 were for seasonal or recreational use.

There were 371 occupied housing units in the CDP. 231 were owner-occupied units (61.3%), while 140 were renter-occupied (37.7%). The homeowner vacancy rate was 4.1% of total units. The rental unit vacancy rate was 18.1%.

Transportation
New York Route 28, running northeast–southwest, the commercial center of the village.

Old Forge Airport, a private use airport is one mile north of Old Forge.

Until 1965, the New York Central Railroad ran passenger service to Thendara station, two miles to the southwest.

Notable people
Old Forge has been home, or at least the summer residence, to many notable people, including former presidents, Olympic athletes, World Cup skiers, and a pioneering female physician.

Lowell Bailey: U.S. Olympic Athlete in Biathlon and World Cup Skier, resided and learned to ski as a youth in Old Forge.
Louie Ehrensbeck: U.S. Olympic Athlete in Biathlon
Patrick Farmer: NCAA and Professional Women's Soccer Coach
Benjamin Harrison: 23rd President of the United States built a summer camp named Berkley Lodge
Chantelle Heroux:  X Games Skicross skier, Director and Founder of "Bridge to Skate" 
Hank Kashiwa: US National Ski Champion, U.S. Olympic Skier, and Sports Commentator 
Maddie Phaneuf: U.S. Olympic Athlete in Biathlon 
Dan Stripp: U.S. World Cup Skier and former U.S. Women's Ski Team Coach.
Sandy Stripp Tetreault: U.S. Foot-Orienteering and World Ski Orienteering Champion 
Gary Vaughn: U.S. Olympic Athlete in Alpine Skiing 
Alexandra Waterbury: model and ballet dancer

References

External links

Old Forge Fire Department
Old Forge Visitor Information Center
Enchanted Forest Water Safari

Adirondacks
Utica–Rome metropolitan area
Former villages in New York (state)
Census-designated places in Herkimer County, New York
Census-designated places in New York (state)
Hamlets in Herkimer County, New York